Hippolyt Kempf (born 10 December 1965, in Lucerne) is a Swiss Nordic combined skier who competed during the late 1980s and early 1990s.

He won a complete set of Olympic medals, earning two of them at the 1988 Winter Olympics in Calgary (gold: 15 km individual, silver: 3 x 10 km team) and the third at the 1994 Winter Olympics in Lillehammer (bronze: 3 x 10 km team).

Kempf also earned a 3 x 10 km team silver medal at the 1989 FIS Nordic World Ski Championships in Lahti.

External links
 
 

1965 births
Living people
Swiss male Nordic combined skiers
Olympic Nordic combined skiers of Switzerland
Nordic combined skiers at the 1988 Winter Olympics
Nordic combined skiers at the 1992 Winter Olympics
Nordic combined skiers at the 1994 Winter Olympics
Olympic gold medalists for Switzerland
Sportspeople from Lucerne
Olympic medalists in Nordic combined
FIS Nordic World Ski Championships medalists in Nordic combined
Medalists at the 1988 Winter Olympics
Medalists at the 1994 Winter Olympics
Olympic silver medalists for Switzerland
Olympic bronze medalists for Switzerland